The following is a partial list of the "D" codes for Medical Subject Headings (MeSH), as defined by the United States National Library of Medicine (NLM).

This list continues the information at List of MeSH codes (D03). Codes following these are found at List of MeSH codes (D05). For other MeSH codes, see List of MeSH codes.

The source for this content is the set of 2006 MeSH Trees from the NLM.

– polycyclic compounds

– bridged compounds

– bicyclo compounds

– macrocyclic compounds

– calixarenes

– crown compounds
  – crown ethers

– cyclodextrins
  – alpha-cyclodextrins
  – beta-cyclodextrins
  – gamma-cyclodextrins

– cycloparaffins

– ethers, cyclic
  – crown ethers

– lactams, macrocyclic
  – maytansine
  – rifamycins
  – rifabutin
  – streptovaricin
  – rifampin

– macrolides
  – amphotericin b
  – antimycin a
  – brefeldin a
  – candicidin
  – cytochalasins
  – cytochalasin b
  – cytochalasin d
  – epothilones
  – erythromycin
  – azithromycin
  – clarithromycin
  – erythromycin estolate
  – erythromycin ethylsuccinate
  – ketolides
  – roxithromycin
  – ivermectin
  – josamycin
  – leucomycins
  – kitasamycin
  – spiramycin
  – lucensomycin
  – mepartricin
  – miocamycin
  – natamycin
  – nystatin
  – oleandomycin
  – troleandomycin
  – oligomycins
  – rutamycin
  – sirolimus
  – tacrolimus
  – tylosin

– peptides, cyclic
  – alamethicin
  – amanitins
  – bacitracin
  – capreomycin sulfate
  – cyclosporins
  – cyclosporine
  – dactinomycin
  – daptomycin
  – depsipeptides
  – valinomycin
  – echinomycin
  – ferrichrome
  – mycobacillin
  – nisin
  – octreotide
  – phalloidine
  – polymyxins
  – colistin
  – polymyxin b
  – streptogramins
  – mikamycin
  – pristinamycin
  – streptogramin group a
  – streptogramin a
  – streptogramin group b
  – streptogramin b
  – vernamycin b
  – virginiamycin
  – streptogramin a
  – thiostrepton
  – viomycin
  – enviomycin

– tetrapyrroles
  – bile pigments
  – bilirubin
  – biliverdine
  – urobilin
  – urobilinogen
  – chlorophyll
  – bacteriochlorophylls
  – chlorophyllides
  – pheophytins
  – protochlorophyllide
  – corrinoids
  – vitamin b 12
  – cobamides
  – hydroxocobalamin
  – porphyrins
  – coproporphyrins
  – deuteroporphyrins
  – etioporphyrins
  – hematoporphyrins
  – hematoporphyrin derivative
  – dihematoporphyrin ether
  – mesoporphyrins
  – metalloporphyrins
  – chlorophyll
  – bacteriochlorophylls
  – chlorophyllides
  – protochlorophyllide
  – heme
  – hemin
  – porphyrinogens
  – coproporphyrinogens
  – uroporphyrinogens
  – protoporphyrins
  – uroporphyrins

– trichothecenes
  – t-2 toxin
  – trichodermin

– polycyclic hydrocarbons, aromatic

– acenaphthenes

– anthracenes
  – dithranol (anthralin) 
  – anthraquinones
  – carmine
  – cascara
  – emodin
  – mitoxantrone
  – maprotiline

– azulenes

– benz(a)anthracenes
  – 9,10-dimethyl-1,2-benzanthracene
  – methylcholanthrene
  – perylene

– benzocycloheptenes
  – dibenzocycloheptenes
  – amitriptyline
  – butaclamol
  – cyproheptadine
  – loratadine
  – dizocilpine maleate
  – nortriptyline
  – protriptyline

– fluorenes
  – 2-acetylaminofluorene
  – acetoxyacetylaminofluorene
  – hydroxyacetylaminofluorene
  – tilorone

– indenes
  – dimethindene
  – indans
  – aprindine
  – ninhydrin
  – phenindione
  – sulindac

– naphthacenes
  – anthracyclines
  – aclarubicin
  – daunorubicin
  – carubicin
  – doxorubicin
  – epirubicin
  – idarubicin
  – nogalamycin
  – menogaril
  – plicamycin
  – tetracyclines
  – chlortetracycline
  – demeclocycline
  – doxycycline
  – lymecycline
  – methacycline
  – minocycline
  – oxytetracycline
  – rolitetracycline
  – tetracycline

– naphthalenes
  – bunaftine
  – carbaryl
  – dansyl compounds
  – lovastatin
  – simvastatin
  – naphthaleneacetic acids
  – naproxen
  – naphthalenesulfonates
  – amaranth dye
  – amido black
  – anilino naphthalenesulfonates
  – congo red
  – Evans blue
  – suramin
  – trypan blue
  – naphthols
  – naphthoquinones
  – vitamin k
  – vitamin k 1
  – vitamin k 2
  – vitamin k 3
  – 1-naphthylamine
  – sertraline
  – 2-naphthylamine
  – 1-naphthylisothiocyanate
  – naphthylvinylpyridine
  – pravastatin
  – propranolol
  – tetrahydronaphthalenes
  – 8-hydroxy-2-(di-n-propylamino)tetralin
  – levobunolol
  – mibefradil
  – podophyllotoxin
  – etoposide
  – tetralones
  – tolnaftate

– phenalenes
  – perylene

– phenanthrenes
  – aristolochic acids
  – chrysenes
  – diterpenes, abietane

– pyrenes
  – benzopyrenes
  – benzo(a)pyrene
  – dihydroxydihydrobenzopyrenes
  – 7,8-dihydro-7,8-dihydroxybenzo(a)pyrene 9,10-oxide

– spiro compounds
  – buspirone
  – fluorescamine
  – fluoresceins
  – eosine i bluish
  – eosine yellowish-(ys)
  – erythrosine
  – fluorescein
  – fluorescein-5-isothiocyanate
  – rose bengal
  – fluspirilene
  – leucogenenol
  – prospidium
  – spiperone

– steroids

– androstanes
  – androstanols
  – androstane-3,17-diol
  – androsterone
  – dihydrotestosterone
  – mesterolone
  – etiocholanolone
  – oxandrolone
  – oxymetholone
  – pancuronium
  – stanozolol
  – vecuronium bromide
  – androstenes
  – androstadienes
  – methandrostenolone
  – testolactone
  – androstatrienes
  – androstenedione
  – androstenols
  – androstenediols
  – androstenediol
  – fluoxymesterone
  – methandriol
  – cyanoketone
  – dehydroepiandrosterone
  – dehydroepiandrosterone sulfate
  – testosterone
  – epitestosterone
  – hydroxytestosterones
  – methenolone
  – methyltestosterone
  – testosterone propionate
  – finasteride

– bile acids and salts
  – cholic acids
  – cholic acid
  – cholates
  – sodium cholate
  – dehydrocholic acid
  – deoxycholic acid
  – chenodeoxycholic acid
  – glycochenodeoxycholic acid
  – taurochenodeoxycholic acid
  – glycodeoxycholic acid
  – glycochenodeoxycholic acid
  – taurodeoxycholic acid
  – taurochenodeoxycholic acid
  – ursodeoxycholic acid
  – glycocholic acid
  – glycodeoxycholic acid
  – glycochenodeoxycholic acid
  – lithocholic acid
  – taurolithocholic acid
  – taurocholic acid
  – taurodeoxycholic acid
  – taurochenodeoxycholic acid
  – taurolithocholic acid

– bufanolides
  – proscillaridin

– cardanolides
  – cardenolides
  – digitoxin
  – acetyldigitoxins
  – digitoxigenin
  – digoxin
  – acetyldigoxins
  – digoxigenin
  – medigoxin
  – strophanthins
  – cymarine
  – ouabain
  – strophanthidin
  – cardiac glycosides
  – digitalis glycosides
  – digitonin
  – digitoxin
  – acetyldigitoxins
  – digoxin
  – acetyldigoxins
  – medigoxin
  – lanatosides
  – deslanoside
  – proscillaridin
  – strophanthins
  – cymarine
  – ouabain

– cholanes
  – cholenes
  – cholic acids
  – cholic acid
  – cholates
  – sodium cholate
  – dehydrocholic acid
  – deoxycholic acid
  – chenodeoxycholic acid
  – glycochenodeoxycholic acid
  – taurochenodeoxycholic acid
  – glycodeoxycholic acid
  – glycochenodeoxycholic acid
  – taurodeoxycholic acid
  – taurochenodeoxycholic acid
  – ursodeoxycholic acid
  – glycocholic acid
  – glycodeoxycholic acid
  – glycochenodeoxycholic acid
  – lithocholic acid
  – taurolithocholic acid
  – taurocholic acid
  – taurodeoxycholic acid
  – taurochenodeoxycholic acid
  – taurolithocholic acid

– cholestanes
  – cholestanols
  – cholestanol
  – cholestanones
  – cholestenes
  – cholecalciferol
  – hydroxycholecalciferols
  – calcifediol
  – dihydroxycholecalciferols
  – calcitriol
  – 24,25-dihydroxyvitamin d 3
  – cholestadienes
  – cholestadienols
  – dehydrocholesterols
  – desmosterol
  – fusidic acid
  – lanosterol
  – stigmasterol
  – cholestenones
  – ecdysteroids
  – ecdysone
  – ecdysterone
  – ketocholesterols
  – cholesterol
  – azacosterol
  – cholesterol esters
  – hydroxycholesterols
  – 19-iodocholesterol
  – ketocholesterols
  – dihydrotachysterol
  – ergocalciferols
  – dihydrotachysterol
  – 25-hydroxyvitamin d 2
  – ergosterol
  – sitosterols
  – sterols
  – adosterol
  – cholecalciferol
  – hydroxycholecalciferols
  – calcifediol
  – dihydroxycholecalciferols
  – calcitriol
  – 24,25-dihydroxyvitamin d 3
  – cholesterol
  – azacosterol
  – cholestanol
  – cholesterol esters
  – dehydrocholesterols
  – desmosterol
  – hydroxycholesterols
  – 19-iodocholesterol
  – ketocholesterols
  – dihydrotachysterol
  – ergocalciferols
  – dihydrotachysterol
  – 25-hydroxyvitamin d 2
  – fusidic acid
  – lanosterol
  – phytosterols
  – ecdysteroids
  – ergosterol
  – sitosterols
  – stigmasterol
  – solanine

– cyclosteroids

– estranes
  – estrenes
  – allylestrenol
  – epimestrol
  – equilenin
  – equilin
  – estradiol
  – estramustine
  – estriol
  – estetrol
  – estrone
  – hydroxyestrones
  – metribolone
  – mifepristone
  – nandrolone
  – trenbolone

– gonanes

– homosteroids
  – testolactone

– hydroxysteroids

– ketosteroids
  – 17-ketosteroids
  – androstenedione
  – androsterone
  – equilenin
  – equilin
  – estrone
  – hydroxyestrones
  – etiocholanolone
  – dehydroepiandrosterone
  – dehydroepiandrosterone sulfate

– norsteroids
  – norandrostanes
  – norpregnanes
  – norpregnadienes
  – promegestone
  – norpregnatrienes
  – ethinyl estradiol
  – ethinyl estradiol-norgestrel combination
  – mestranol
  – quinestrol
  – norgestrienone
  – gestrinone
  – norpregnenes
  – desogestrel
  – ethylestrenol
  – etynodiol diacetate
  – gestonorone caproate
  – lynestrenol
  – norethandrolone
  – norethisterone
  – noretynodrel
  – norgestrel
  – ethinyl estradiol-norgestrel combination
  – levonorgestrel
  – norprogesterones

– pregnanes
  – pregnadienes
  – canrenoate potassium
  – canrenone
  – chlormadinone acetate
  – cyproterone
  – cyproterone acetate
  – danazol
  – dydrogesterone
  – fluocinolone acetonide
  – fluocinonide
  – medrogestone
  – megestrol
  – megestrol acetate
  – melengestrol acetate
  – pregnadienediols
  – desoximetasone
  – fluocortolone
  – diflucortolone
  – fluorometholone
  – prednisone
  – pregnadienetriols
  – beclomethasone
  – betamethasone
  – betamethasone 17-valerate
  – desonide
  – dexamethasone
  – dexamethasone isonicotinate
  – flumethasone
  – paramethasone
  – prednisolone
  – fluprednisolone
  – methylprednisolone
  – methylprednisolone hemisuccinate
  – prednimustine
  – triamcinolone
  – triamcinolone acetonide
  – pregnanediol
  – pregnanediones
  – 5-alpha-dihydroprogesterone
  – alfaxalone alfadolone mixture
  – tetrahydrocortisone
  – pregnanetriol
  – pregnanolone
  – pregnatrienes
  – pregnenes
  – cortisone
  – dimethisterone
  – ethisterone
  – pregnenediones
  – aldosterone
  – budesonide
  – corticosterone
  – 18-hydroxycorticosterone
  – cortodoxone
  – desoxycorticosterone
  – 18-hydroxydesoxycorticosterone
  – flurandrenolone
  – flurogestone acetate
  – gestonorone caproate
  – halcinonide
  – hydrocortisone
  – fludrocortisone
  – progesterone
  – algestone
  – algestone acetophenide
  – 20-alpha-dihydroprogesterone
  – hydroxyprogesterones
  – 17-alpha-hydroxyprogesterone
  – medroxyprogesterone
  – medroxyprogesterone 17-acetate
  – pregnenolone
  – 17-alpha-hydroxypregnenolone
  – pregnenolone carbonitrile
  – spironolactone
  – tetrahydrocortisol

– secosteroids
  – vitamin d
  – cholecalciferol
  – hydroxycholecalciferols
  – calcifediol
  – dihydroxycholecalciferols
  – calcitriol
  – 24,25-dihydroxyvitamin d 3
  – ergocalciferols
  – dihydrotachysterol
  – 25-hydroxyvitamin d 2

– spirostans
  – sapogenins
  – diosgenin

– steroids, brominated

– steroids, chlorinated
  – beclomethasone
  – chlormadinone acetate
  – cyproterone
  – cyproterone acetate

– steroids, fluorinated
  – betamethasone
  – betamethasone 17-valerate
  – clobetasol
  – dexamethasone
  – desoximetasone
  – dexamethasone isonicotinate
  – flumethasone
  – fluocinolone acetonide
  – fluocinonide
  – fluocortolone
  – diflucortolone
  – fluorometholone
  – fluoxymesterone
  – fluprednisolone
  – flurandrenolone
  – flurogestone acetate
  – paramethasone
  – triamcinolone
  – triamcinolone acetonide

– steroids, heterocyclic
  – azasteroids
  – finasteride

The list continues at List of MeSH codes (D05).

D04